Aleksandr Lakatosh (born 9 April 1974) is a Russian fencer. He competed in the team foil event at the 2000 Summer Olympics.

References

1974 births
Living people
Russian male fencers
Olympic fencers of Russia
Fencers at the 2000 Summer Olympics
Sportspeople from Saint Petersburg